Zernograd is an airbase of the Russian Air Force in Zernograd, Rostov Oblast, Russia.

The base is home to the 16th Army Aviation Brigade.

106th Training Aviation Regiment between 1969 and 1995.

286th independent Helicopter Squadron for Electronic Warfare between 1992 and 1998.

References

Russian Air Force bases